Colțea may refer to several entities in Romania:

Colțea, a village in Roșiori Commune, Brăila County
CS Colțea Brașov, a football club
In Bucharest:
Turnul Colței
Colțea Hospital
Colțea Monastery